This page lists all the tours and matches played by Pakistan national field hockey team from 2005 to 2009. During this period Pakistan won the 2005 Hockey RaboTrophy their first high-profile tournament won since 1994. Pakistan also won a silver medal at the 2006 Commonwealth Games.

List of tours

Results

2005

2005 Sultan Azlan Shah Cup

2005 Hamburg Masters

2005 Hockey RaboTrophy

2005 Hockey Champions Trophy

2006

2006 Series – India

2006 Commonwealth Games

2006 Intercontinental Cup

2006 Sultan Azlan Shah Cup

2006 Hockey Champions Trophy

2006 Hamburg Masters

2006 Hockey World Cup

2006 Asian Games

2007

2007Sultan Azlan Shah Cup

Four Nations Tournament

Good Luck Beijing Hockey International

2007 Hockey Asia Cup

2007 Hockey Champions Trophy

2008

2008 Series – China 

Field hockey in Pakistan